Julie Bénédicte Deiters (born 4 September 1975 in Meudon) is a France-born former Dutch field hockey player. She played 166 international matches for the Netherlands, in which the defender scored fourteen goals.

Deiters was a member of the Netherlands squad that won the bronze medal at the 2000 Summer Olympics in Sydney. A player from Amsterdam, Deiters made her debut on 4 February 1997 in a friendly against South Africa. Her last match for the Dutch Women's Team came on August 26, 2001, when she faced Argentina (2-3) during the Champions Trophy in Amstelveen.

References

External links
 

1975 births
Living people
Dutch female field hockey players
Olympic field hockey players of the Netherlands
Field hockey players at the 2000 Summer Olympics
Dutch people of French descent
Olympic medalists in field hockey
Medalists at the 2000 Summer Olympics
People from Meudon
Olympic bronze medalists for the Netherlands
Sportspeople from Hauts-de-Seine